Saintes-Maries is the subject of a series of paintings that Vincent van Gogh made in 1888.  When Van Gogh lived in Arles, he took a trip to Saintes-Maries-de-la-Mer on the Mediterranean Sea, where he made several paintings of the seascape and town.

Saintes-Maries-de-la-Mer
In June 1888, Van Gogh took a 30-mile stagecoach trip from Arles to the sea-side fishing village of Saintes-Maries-de-la-Mer on the coast of the Mediterranean Sea.  Van Gogh's week-long trip was taken to recover from his health problems and make some seaside paintings and drawings.  At that time, Saintes-Maries was a small fishing village with under a hundred homes.

Seaside
In just a few days, he made two paintings of the sea, one of the village and nine drawings.  One of the paintings was Van Gogh Museum's Fishing Boats on the Beach at Saintes-Maries-de-la-Mer (F413), which he described to his brother, Theo: "I made the drawing of the boats when I left very early in the morning, and I am now working on a painting based on it, a size 30 canvas with more sea and sky on the right. It was before the boats hastened out; I had watched them every morning, but as they leave very early I didn't have time to paint them."  Some of the work on the painting was finished in the studio, such as capturing the light in the sand, sea and sky.

Another seascape Van Gogh made was The Sea at Les Saintes-Maries-de-la-Mer (F415) in which he sought to capture light's effect on the sea.  He wrote that the "Mediterranean Sea is a mackerel color: in other words, changeable – you do not always know whether it is green or purple, you do not always know if it is blue, as the next moment the ever-changing sheen has assumed a pink or a gray tint."  The setting includes fishing boats returning to the village. To emphasize contrast to the color green in the painting, Van Gogh signs his name in large bright red letters.

Fishing Boats at Saintes-Maries-de-la-Mer (F1433) is one of Van Gogh's reed pen drawings of Saint-Maries which he based on his painting The Sea at Les Saintes-Maries-de-la-Mer (F415).  The fluid movements of Van Gogh's pen bring an energy to the drawing, not intended to be a mimetic copy.  Both his choice of the reed pen and the "placement of tiered-patterned strokes" reflect the influence of Japanese prints.  He brings life to the painting through technique.  The Pointillist dotted sky accentuates the clouds.  Whitecaps are evoked by the vertical lines and horizontal lines portray the calmer sea in the distance.

Seascape at Saintes-Maries (Fishing Boats at Sea) was painted six years after Van Gogh wrote that he wished to paint a seaside painting of sand, sea and sky.  In this painting the combination of a high horizon and boats close to the top edge of the frame, draw the audience in to the choppy sea in the foreground and center of the picture.  He also made three drawings of this composition.

Town
In the painting View of Saintes-Maries (F416), Van Gogh painted rows of what is likely lavender from the foreground to the town of Saintes-Maries in the center of the frame, thereby drawing the viewer into the painting.  A wall encloses the town in which a large church becomes the focal point.  The painting takes upon a three-dimensional appearance, starting with relief-like layers of blue paint in the sky.  Finer brushstrokes were used on the field and town buildings.

The Philadelphia Museum of Art owns a drawing that Van Gogh made titled The Road at Saintes-Maries.  It is also known as Cottages in Saintes-Maries (F1436).

References

Bibliography
 Beaujean, D (2000). Van Gogh: Life and Work. Cologne: Konemann. .

1888 paintings
Series of paintings by Vincent van Gogh
Paintings of Arles by Vincent van Gogh
Maritime paintings
Paintings in the collection of the Hermitage Museum